Darren Lance Adonis (born ) is a South African rugby union player for the  in the Pro14, the  in the Currie Cup and the  in the Rugby Challenge. His regular position is fullback or wing.

International career
In December 2022, he was called to the South African Sevens Rugby Team to compete in the World Rugby Sevens Series in the Cape Town Tournament.

References

South African rugby union players
Living people
1998 births
Rugby union players from Cape Town
Rugby union wings
Rugby union fullbacks
Cheetahs (rugby union) players
Free State Cheetahs players